Jean Edmond Cyrus Rostand (30 October 1894, Paris – 4 September 1977, Ville-d'Avray) was a French biologist, historian of science, and philosopher.

Active as an experimental biologist, Rostand became famous for his work as a science writer, as well as a philosopher and an activist. His scientific work covered a variety of biological fields such as amphibian embryology, parthenogenesis and teratogeny, while his literary output extended into popular science, history of science and philosophy. His work in the area of cryogenics gave the idea of cryonics to Robert Ettinger. He took an interest in ethics and morality in biology and wrote against pseudoscience, the use of science for war, wrote against racism and supported human equality and freedom.

Rostand Island in Antarctica is named after him.

Biography
Rostand was born in Paris to playwright Edmond Rostand and poet Rosemonde Gérard.  He was the brother of novelist and playwright Maurice Rostand. His paternal grandfather Eugène Rostand had been a political scientist and economist. The family moved to Cambo-les-Bains in 1900 and Rostand grew up with a fascination for natural history in these surroundings. He was educated by home tutors and read the works of J. H. Fabre, Claude Bernard and Charles Darwin. He then went to study natural sciences at the University of Sorbonne and graduated in 1914.

Rostand's biological research began with work on paedogenesis in flies, studies on silkworms and dragonflies before beginning to work on embryology in frogs. In 1910 he was able to induce parthenogenesis in the eggs of Rana temporaria. He then examined polydactyly and its induction by chemical agents in frogs and studied the preservation of sperm vitality using glycerine. He also examined the determination of sex in frogs. For his work in biology he received the Henry de Parville Prize in 1934 and the Binoux Prize in 1941.

Following in the footsteps of his father, Rostand was elected to the Académie française in 1959.

Rostand was active in several causes, in particular against nuclear proliferation and the death penalty. An agnostic, he demonstrated humanist convictions. He wrote several books on the question of eugenism and the responsibilities of mankind regarding its own fate and its place in nature. 

Rostand took a special interest in the history of science and especially stressed the slow process by which scientific facts were determined and how they emerged from the interactions of numerous people and highlighted the need for modesty, especially because of the fallibility of individual workers. For his work in the popularization of science he received a Kalinga Prize in 1959.

Rostand is famous for the quotation: "Kill one man, and you are a murderer. Kill millions of men, and you are a conqueror. Kill them all, and you are a God" from Thoughts of a Biologist, 1938.

In the preface of the 1959 Italian edition of his Artificial man, Rostand foresaw artificial oviparity, gender mutation, virgin births, as well as DNA modifications before and after the birth.

Rostand married a cousin Andrée Mante in 1920 and they had a son François who became a mathematician. After 1922 he set up a laboratory in his home at Ville d’Avray and began to conduct most of his research there, free of institutional demands. He would meet people from a wide range of interests at his home on Sundays. He died following prolonged ill-health at home.

Works
 Le retour des pauvres , 1919 - Return of the poor 
 La loi des riches, 1920 - The law of the rich 
 Pendant qu’on souffre encore, 1921 - While suffering endures
 Ignace ou l'Écrivain , 1923 - Ignace or the writer 
 Deux angoisses : la mort, l’amour, 1924 - Two anguishes: love and death
 De la vanité et de quelques autres sujets , 1925 - Of vanity and several other subjects 
 Les familiotes et autres essais de mystique bourgeoise, 1925 - The familiotes and other essays of the bourgeois mystique
 De l’amour des idées , 1926 - On the love of ideas 
 Le mariage, 1927 - Marriage 
 Valère ou l’Exaspéré, 1927 - Valère or The exasperated 
 Julien ou Une conscience, 1928 - Julien or A conscience 
 Les chromosomes, artisans de l’hérédité et du sexe, 1929 - Chromosomes, artisans of heredity and sex
 De la mouche à l’Homme, 1930 - From fly to man 
 L’état présent du transformisme, 1931 - The current state of transformism 
 Journal d’un caractère, 1931 - Journal of a character 
 L’Évolution des espèces, 1932 - The evolution of species 
 Les problèmes de l’hérédité et du sexe, 1933 - The problems of heredity and sex 
 L’aventure humaine, 1933 - The human adventure 
 La vie des libellules, 1935 - The life of dragonflies 
 Insectes, 1936 - Insects 
 La nouvelle biologie, 1937 - The new biology 
 Biologie et médecine, 1938 - Biology and medicine 
 Hérédité et racisme, 1938 - Heredity and racism 
 Pensée d’un biologiste, 1938 - Thoughts from a biologist 
 La vie et ses problèmes, 1938 - Life and its problems 
 Science et génération, 1940 - Science and generation 
 Les idées nouvelles de la génétique, 1941 - New ideas in genetics 
 L’Homme, introduction à l’étude de la biologie humaine , 1941 - Man, introduction to the study of human biology 
 L’Homme, maître de la vie, 1941 - Man, master of life 
 Hommes de vérité 1942 - Men of truth 
 L’avenir de la biologie, 1943 - The future of biology 
 La genèse de la vie, histoire des idées sur la génération spontanée , 1943 - Genesis of life, a history of the ideas on spontaneous generation 
 La vie des vers à soie , 1944 - The life of silkworms 
 Esquisse d’une histoire de la biologie , 1945 - Sketch of a history of biology 
 L’avenir de la biologie, 1946 - The future of biology 
 Qu’est-ce qu’un enfant ?, 1946 - What is a child? Charles Darwin, 1947
 Nouvelles pensées d’un biologiste, 1947 - New thoughts from a biologist 
 L’hérédité humaine , 1948 - Human heredity 
 Hommes de vérité II , 1948 - Men of truth II 
 La biologie et l’avenir humain, 1949 - Biology and the human future 
 L’Homme devant la biologie, 1949 - Man facing biology 
 La parthénogenèse, reproduction virginale chez les animaux, 1949 - Parthenogenesis, virginal reproduction in animals 
 La parthénogenèse animale, 1949 - Animal parthenogenesis 
 La génétique des batraciens, 1951 - Batrachian genetics 
 Les grands courants de la biologie , 1951 - Great trends in biology 
 Les origines de la biologie expérimentale et l’abbé Spallanzani, 1951 - The origins of experimental biology and the Abbé Spallanzani L’hérédité humaine, 1952 - Human heredity 
 Pages d’un moraliste , 1952 - Pages by a moralist 
 Ce que nous apprennent les crapauds et les grenouilles, 1953 - What toads and frogs teach us 
 La vie, cette aventure, 1953 - Life, that adventure 
 Ce que je crois, 1953 - What I believe 
 Instruire sur l’Homme, 1953 - To instruct on Man 
 Notes d’un biologiste , 1954 - Notes from a biologist 
 Les crapauds et les grenouilles et quelques grands problèmes biologiques, 1955 - Toads, frogs and a few great problems in biology 
 Le problème biologique de l’individu, 1955 - The biological problem of the individual 
 L’Homme en l’an 2000, 1956 - Man in the year 2000 Peut-on modifier l’Homme?, 1956 - Can we modify Man? L’atomisme en biologie, 1956 - Atomism in biology Bestiaire d’amour, 1958 - A bestiary of love 
 Aux sources de la biologie, 1958 - At the sources of biology 
 Anomalies des amphibiens anoures, 1958 - Anomalies of anurian amphibians 
 Science fausse et fausses sciences, 1958 - Erroneous science and false science 
 Les origines de la biologie expérimentale, 1959 - Origins of experimental biology Carnet d’un biologiste, 1959 - Notepad of a biologist Espoirs et inquiétudes de l’homme, 1959 - The hopes and worries of ManReferences

Further reading
 Marcel Migeo: Les Rostand'', Paris, Stock, 1973. About Edmond, Rosemonde, Jean and Maurice Rostand.

External links

Jean Rostand "homme de vérité"

1894 births
1977 deaths
Writers from Paris
20th-century French philosophers
Philosophers of science
Members of the Académie Française
French science writers
French male non-fiction writers
French eugenicists
French agnostics
Kalinga Prize recipients
20th-century French male writers
Historians of science